Bellator 268: Nemkov vs. Anglickas (also known as Bellator Phoenix) was a mixed martial arts event produced by Bellator MMA that took place on October 16, 2021, at the Footprint Center in Phoenix, Arizona, United States.

Background 
The event was headlined by both of the high-profile semifinal matchups for the Bellator Light Heavyweight World Grand Prix Tournament and took place at the Footprint Center, home of the Phoenix Suns and Phoenix Mercury. Current Bellator Light Heavyweight Champion Vadim Nemkov was to defend his title against Anthony “Rumble” Johnson, while current Bellator Heavyweight Champion Ryan Bader faced Corey Anderson in the co-main event. On September 18, it was announced that Anthony Johnson was forced to pull out of the bout due to an illness that will keep him out until 2022. Nemkov instead faced the alternate Julius Anglickas. Anglickas's opponent Karl Albrektsson was rescheduled with Dovletdzhan Yagshimuradov.

A bantamweight bout between Brett Johns and Érik Pérez was scheduled for this event. However on October 5, it was announced that Perez was injured and the bout was scrapped.

At the weigh-ins, Bobby Lee missed weight for his bout. Lee weighed in at 156.8 pounds, 0.8 pounds over the lightweight non-title fight limit. The bout proceeded at catchweight and Lee was fined a percentage of his purse which went to his opponent Nick Browne.

Results

Reported payout 
The following is the reported payout to the fighters as reported to the Arizona Department of Gaming. The figures do not include discretionary bonuses or sponsorship money.. It is important to note the amounts do not include sponsor money, discretionary bonuses, viewership points or additional earnings. The total disclosed payout for the event was $1,353,300.

MAIN CARD (10 p.m. E.T., Showtime)

 Vadim Nemkov: $250,000 (includes $75,000 win bonus) def. Julius Anglickas: $150,000
 Corey Anderson: $200,000 (includes $100,000 win bonus)  def. Ryan Bader: $150,000
 Brent Primus: $50,000 (no win bonus) def. Benson Henderson: $150,000
 Henry Corrales: $50,000 (includes $25,000 win bonus) def. Vladyslav Parubchenko: $10,000
 Karl Albrektsson: $50,000 (includes $25,000 win bonus) def. Dovletdzhan Yagshimuradov: $70,000

PRELIMS (7 p.m. E.T., YouTube/PlutoTV)

 Mukhamed Berkhamov: $60,000 (includes $30,000 win bonus) def. Jaleel Willis: $24,000
 Nick Browne: $37,200 (includes $18,000 win bonus, $1,200 fine from Lee) def. Bobby Lee: $9,600 (includes $2,400 deduction)
 Javier Torres: $20,000 (includes $10,000 win bonus) def. Gregory Millard: $13,000
 Sumiko Inaba: $10,000 (includes $5,000 win bonus) def. Randi Field: $4,000
 Lance Gibson Jr.: $14,000 (includes $7,000 win bonus) def. Raymond Pina: $3,000
 Jaylon Bates: $20,000 (no win bonus) def. Raphael Montini: $2,500
 Sullivan Cauley: $4,000 (includes $2,000 win bonus) def. Deon Clash: $2,000

See also 

 2021 in Bellator MMA
 List of Bellator MMA events
 List of current Bellator fighters
 Bellator MMA Rankings

References 

Bellator MMA events
2021 in mixed martial arts
Events in Phoenix, Arizona
October 2021 sports events in the United States
2021 in sports in Arizona
Mixed martial arts in Arizona
Sports competitions in Arizona